Fisheries Development Authority of Malaysia (Lembaga Kemajuan Ikan Malaysia) is an agency under Ministry of Agriculture and Food Industries of Malaysia. It is established in 1971 to maintain adequate supply of fish and seafood in Malaysia. It is responsible to improve social and economic status of fishermen and improve fishing industry in the nation. The current chairman is Syed Abu Hussin Hafiz.

History 
LKIM is established on 1 November 1971 according to The Fisheries Development Authority of Malaysia Act 1971 (Act 49). This act is enforced in Malaysia Peninsula on 1 November 1971, in Sarawak on 1 July 1973 and in Sabah on 1 August 1995.

References 

Ministry of Agriculture and Food Industries (Malaysia)
Fishing industry
Government agencies established in 1971
Organisations based in Kuala Lumpur